Parrack is a surname. Notable persons with that name include:

Doyle Parrack (1921–2008), American basketball player and coach
James Parrack (born 1967), English sports journalist and former swimmer 
Jim Parrack (born 1981), American actor 
Martin Parrack (born 1955), English vehicle weighing and transport consultant
Timothy Parrack (born 1977),
Independent Claims Adjuster